Todros ben Joseph Abulafia (1225 – c. 1285) was a nephew of Meir Abulafia and Chief Rabbi of Castile. Born in Burgos, Spain to a prominent rabbinical family, he moved to Castile and was welcomed by the court of Alfonso X of Castile, joining the royal retinue on a trip to France in 1275. He is the author of Otzar HaKavod, a mystical commentary on the Aggadah, among other works. In his sermon Zikaron LeYehudah, he condemned what he saw as a lack of modesty in the community.

He died in the city of Toledo.

References 

1225 births
1280s deaths
Year of death uncertain
13th-century Castilian rabbis